The SACCO Societies Regulatory Authority (SASRA) is the primary regulatory body charged with licensing DepositTaking Sacco Societies (Savings and Credit Co-operatives Societies) - DT regulation 2010 and authorizing specified Non Deposit taking saccos - NDTS Regulations 2021 in the Republic of Kenya.

History 
The Authority was established as a body corporate in 2010, pursuant to the provisions of the Sacco Societies Act with the primary purpose of streamlining the regulation of SACCOs and Co-operatives in the country under the supervision of the Commissioner of Co-operative Development, an office under the Ministry of Agriculture, Livestock, Fisheries and Co-operatives.

Its mandate is to regulate, supervise and license SACCOs and Co-operatives in the country while receiving levy contributions from the same in accordance with the Sacco Societies Act of 2008.

References

External links 
Sacco Societies Regulatory Authority

Commercial and Financial Services
Kenya
Regulatory agencies of Kenya